Jody Jason February (born 12 May 1996) is a South African soccer player who plays as a goalkeeper for Mamelodi Sundowns. He was born in Cape Town.

Club career
February started his career at Ajax Cape Town before signing for Mamelodi Sundowns in September 2019. He was loaned out to Cape Umoya United for the 2019–20 season.

International career
February played for the South Africa under-23 team at the 2015 Africa U-23 Cup of Nations.

He represented South Africa in the football competition at the 2016 Summer Olympics.

References

1996 births
Living people
Soccer players from Cape Town
Cape Coloureds
South African soccer players
Cape Town Spurs F.C. players
Mamelodi Sundowns F.C. players
Cape Umoya United F.C. players
Moroka Swallows F.C. players
South African Premier Division players
National First Division players
Footballers at the 2016 Summer Olympics
Olympic soccer players of South Africa
Association football goalkeepers
South Africa youth international soccer players
South Africa international soccer players
2015 Africa U-23 Cup of Nations players